Frederick William Van Dusen (July 31, 1937 – June 1, 2018) was an American Major League Baseball player. Van Dusen played for Philadelphia Phillies in the 1955 season. 

An outfielder by trade, out of William Cullen Bryant High School, Van Dusen was signed by the Phillies in August 1955 as a bonus baby, meaning he had to be kept on the Phillies' 40-man roster for two years. During his first month with the team, he appeared just once, pinch hitting in the second game of a doubleheader against the Milwaukee Braves on September 11, 1955 at County Stadium. In the ninth inning, with the Phillies down 9-1, he pinch hit for pitcher Lynn Lovenguth against Humberto Robinson and was hit by a pitch. While Van Dusen never appeared in another major league game, he did continue to play in the Phillies minor league organization until  before retiring.

Van Dusen divorced his first wife, with whom he had three children, after his baseball career ended. He later remarried and became an insurance agent based in New York.

References

External links

MLB.com article

1937 births
2018 deaths
Philadelphia Phillies players
Asheville Tourists players
Chattanooga Lookouts players
Williamsport Grays players
Indianapolis Indians players
Miami Marlins (IL) players
High Point-Thomasville Hi-Toms players
Wilson Tobs players
Baseball players from New York (state)
People from Jackson Heights, Queens
20th-century American businesspeople
American businesspeople in insurance
Businesspeople from New York (state)
Insurance agents